Schlenk can refer to:

People
 Wilhelm Schlenk (1879-1943), German chemist

In chemistry
 Schlenk flask
 Schlenk line. or Schlenk apparatus
 Schlenk equilibrium

Other
 Mepco Schlenk Engineering College